United Counties may refer to one of the following places:

in Australia:
 Electoral district of United Counties of Murray and St Vincent, an electoral district of the Australian state of New South Wales, established 1856, dissolved 1859

in England:
 Northamptonshire, Bedfordshire, and surrounding counties, as used by:
 United Counties Football League
 United Counties Omnibus

in Ontario, Canada:
 Some current and historical counties in the province of Ontario, Canada
 Leeds and Grenville United Counties, Ontario, established 1850
 Prescott and Russell United Counties, Ontario, established 1820
 Stormont, Dundas and Glengarry United Counties, established 1850
 United Counties of Lincoln, Welland and Haldimand, Ontario, established 1849, since dissolved
 United Counties of Northumberland and Durham, Ontario, established 1849, dissolved in 1974